Sarah MacPhail (born 8 August 1997) is a Scottish netball player who plays for Scotland in the positions of goal defense, wing defense or center. She made her World Cup debut for Scotland during the 2019 Netball World Cup.

References 

1997 births
Living people
Scottish netball players
Sportspeople from Orkney
2019 Netball World Cup players
Sirens Netball players
Netball Superleague players